Alfonso Navarrete Prida (born 13 October 1963) is a Mexican politician from the Institutional Revolutionary Party who served as the Secretary of the Interior in 2018. He previously served as the Secretary of Labor of Mexico from 2012 to 2018. From 2009 to 2012 he served as Deputy of the LXI Legislature of the Mexican Congress representing the State of Mexico.

Navarrete was on board the helicopter which crashed in February 2018 while surveying the damage done by a recent earthquake. 14 people were killed in the crash, but Navarrete and fellow politician Alejandro Murat Hinojosa escaped with comparatively minor injuries.

References

1963 births
Living people
Politicians from Mexico City
Members of the Chamber of Deputies (Mexico) for the State of Mexico
Institutional Revolutionary Party politicians
Mexican Secretaries of Labor
21st-century Mexican politicians
Mexican Secretaries of the Interior
Survivors of aviation accidents or incidents
Deputies of the LXI Legislature of Mexico